A small number of municipalities in Serbia held local elections in 2006 for mayors, assembly members, or both. These were not part of the country's regular cycle of local elections but instead took place in certain jurisdictions where either the local government had fallen or the term of the municipal assembly had expired.

Serbia had introduced the direct election of mayors in 2002. This practice was abandoned with the 2008 cycle, but it was still in effect in 2006, and some mayoral by-elections took place in that year. The constituent municipalities of Belgrade did not have directly elected mayors, and in these jurisdictions mayors were chosen by the elected assembly members.

Not many local elections were held in 2007 due to the approaching 2008 Serbian local elections, in which all Serbian municipalities elected assembly members under a revised system. At least one sitting mayor won a recall election in that year, however.

All assembly elections were held under proportional representation with a three per cent electoral threshold. Successful lists were required to receive three per cent of all votes, not only of valid votes.

Results

2006

Belgrade

Barajevo
An election for the Barajevo municipal assembly was held on 1 October 2006, with repeat voting in some polls on 8 October.

Incumbent mayor Rade Stevanović of the Democratic Party of Serbia was selected for another term in office on 8 December 2006. He was dismissed from office on 12 February 2007 but was reinstated nine days later. Branislav Đurić of the Radical Party appears to have been acting mayor during the brief time Stevanović was out of office.

Stevanović was again dismissed on 30 April 2007. Igor Jevtić of New Serbia was initially dismissed as deputy mayor at the same time; however, his dismissal was overturned on 15 May and he appears to have served as acting mayor prior to the appointment of Branka Savić of the Democratic Party on 25 June.

Vojvodina

Bečej
Former Bečej mayor Đorđe Predin had been defeated in a 2005 recall election, and a by-election to replace him was held over two rounds on 5 and 19 February 2006. Peter Knezi, who had served as deputy mayor, may have been acting mayor during the election period.

Beočin
Beočin mayor Zoran Tesić won a recall election on 3 December 2006. The preliminary results of the election were:

Kovin
A new municipal assembly election was held in Kovin on 4 June 2006, and a mayoral by-election was held in two rounds on 25 June and 9 July.

Krstić was elected in the second round with the support of 17.45% of eligible voters, as against 16.41% for Kolarević.

Kula
Kula mayor Tihomir Đuričić was defeated in a recall election on 7 May 2006. A by-election to select a new mayor was held over two rounds on 25 June and 9 July 2006.

Novi Bečej
Novi Bečej mayor Aca T. Ðukičin was defeated in a recall election on 9 April 2006.

A by-election to select a new mayor was held over two rounds on 4 and 18 June 2006.

Odžaci
Odžaci mayor Milan Ćuk won a recall election on 3 December 2006.

Central Serbia (excluding Belgrade)

Despotovac
Elections were held in Despotovac on 1 October 2006 to elect a mayor and members of the municipal assembly. The second round of voting in the mayoral election took place on 15 October 2006.

Results of the election for the Municipal Assembly of Despotovac:

Doljevac
Elections were held in Doljevac on 1 October 2006 to elect members of the municipal assembly. The results do not appear to be available online. Goran Ljubić's status as mayor was not affected, and the next local assembly elections took place as part of the regular cycle in 2008.

Kraljevo
Radoslav Jović resigned as mayor of Kraljevo on 24 November 2006. A by-election to choose his replacement was held over two rounds on 5 and 19 February 2006. The results were as follows:

Novi Pazar
The 2004 elections in Novi Pazar produced a divided government: Sulejman Ugljanin of the Party of Democratic Action of Sandžak was elected as mayor, but his party did not command a majority in the assembly and the rival Sandžak Democratic Party was able to form a coalition administration.

The government of Serbia introduced a provisional administration to Novi Pazar in April 2006 on the grounds that the assembly did not adopt the budget within the legal deadline. A new assembly election was scheduled for 11 September 2006.

At the time this happened, there was already an effort underway to recall Ugljanin as mayor. This effort ended in chaos, with two separate votes taking place. The first recall election, held on 14 May 2006, was organized by an election commission appointed by the former SDP-led administration. In this vote, ninety-eight per cent of voters supported recall. The second election, held on 25 June 2006, was by contrast led by a commission appointed by the interim government; in the latter vote, about ninety-seven per cent of voters opposed recall. Ultimately, Ugljanin was not removed from office.

The results of the municipal assembly election were as follows:

Ražanj
Ražanj mayor Životije Popović was defeated in a recall election on 30 April 2006.

New assembly elections had originally been scheduled for later in the year, as the previous elections had been held in 2002. Following Popović's defeat in the recall vote, the assembly elections were brought forward by a few months to coincide with the new mayoral election. Both elections took place on 25 June 2006. The second round of voting in the mayoral election took place on 9 July 2006.

Results of the election for the Municipal Assembly of Ražanj:

Smederevo
Jasna Avramović, who had been elected as mayor in the 2004 Serbian local elections, was defeated in a recall election in late 2005. A by-election to determine her successor was held over two rounds on 12 February and 5 March 2006. The results were as follows:

2007

Central Serbia (excluding Belgrade)

Svilajnac
Svilajnac mayor Dobrivoje Budimirović won a recall election on 2 September 2007.

References

Local elections in Serbia
2006 elections in Serbia